John Eldon Miller (March 2, 1929 – June 18, 2014) was an American politician and businessman.

Born in Melbourne, Arkansas, Miller received his bachelor's degree in chemistry from Arkansas State University. He worked in real estate, retail business, title abstract, and insurance. He served in the Arkansas House of Representatives and served as speaker. He died in Melbourne, Arkansas.

Notes

1929 births
2014 deaths
People from Izard County, Arkansas
Arkansas State University alumni
Businesspeople from Arkansas
Speakers of the Arkansas House of Representatives
Democratic Party members of the Arkansas House of Representatives
20th-century American businesspeople